The 1993 World Badminton Grand Prix was the 11th edition of the World Badminton Grand Prix finals. It was held in Kuala Lumpur, Malaysia, from December 15 to December 19, 1993.

Final results

References
Smash: World Grand Prix Finals, Kuala Lumpur 1993

World Grand Prix
World Badminton Grand Prix
Badminton tournaments in Malaysia
Sport in Kuala Lumpur
World Badminton Grand Prix
World Badminton Grand Prix Finals